Made on Broadway is a 1933 American pre-Code comedy film directed by Harry Beaumont and written by Courtney Terrett. The film stars Robert Montgomery, Sally Eilers, Madge Evans, Eugene Pallette, C. Henry Gordon and Jean Parker. The film was released on May 19, 1933, by Metro-Goldwyn-Mayer.

Plot
Jeff, The Broadway Fixer is a man about town and very popular with the ladies.  One night, he sees a girl, Mona, jump from the Staten Island Ferry and he dives in after her.  Not one to miss an opportunity, before they've been rescued from the drink, he's figuring a way to promote her as a celebrity. No longer despondent, Mona falls in with his scheme and she eagerly takes to her new notoriety Jeff falls in love with his creation, not realizing what a gold digger he has fostered. All the while, his ex wife, Claire, is on the sidelines. dressing and schooling his protege. He gets a call, in the middle of the night, that Mona has shot a man in her bedroom. Jeff rides to the rescue, concocts a story that they can sell to a jury and masterfully steers events to an acquittal. Not done, he destroys the letters that Mona had planned to use for blackmail and saves his favorite client from her clutches. He and ex wife are reunited and all live happily ever after.

Cast 
Robert Montgomery as Jeff
Sally Eilers as Mona
Madge Evans as Claire
Eugene Pallette as Terwilliger
C. Henry Gordon as Mayor Starling
Jean Parker as Adele
Ivan Lebedeff as Ramon
David Newell as Mayor's Secretary
Vince Barnett as Mr. Lepedis
Joseph Cawthorn as Schultz

References

External links 
 

1933 films
American comedy films
1933 comedy films
Metro-Goldwyn-Mayer films
Films directed by Harry Beaumont
American black-and-white films
1930s English-language films
1930s American films